Donatella Sciuto (born 1962) is an Italian electronic engineer and academic administrator, the rector of the Polytechnic University of Milan. Her research involves embedded systems, low-power electronics, and multicore Very Large Scale Integration, with applications including smart buildings.

Education and career
Sciuto was born in 1962 in Varese. After earning a laurea in electronic engineering from the Polytechnic University of Milan, Sciuto went to the University of Colorado Boulder for doctoral study in electrical and computer engineering. She also has a Master of Business Administration from Bocconi University.

She became an assistant professor at the University of Brescia in 1986, returned to the Polytechnic University of Milan as an associate professor in 1992, and was promoted to full professor in 2000. She became vice rector of the university in 2010, and executive vice rector in 2015. She was elected as rector for the 2023–2028 term, becoming the first woman to lead the university.

Recognition
Sciuto was elected as an IEEE Fellow in 2011 "for contributions to embedded system design". She was elected to the Academia Europaea in 2022.

References

External links
Home page

1962 births
Living people
People from Varese
Italian electrical engineers
Italian women engineers
Polytechnic University of Milan alumni
University of Colorado Boulder alumni
Bocconi University alumni
Academic staff of the University of Brescia
Academic staff of the Polytechnic University of Milan
Fellow Members of the IEEE
Members of Academia Europaea
Women electrical engineers
Heads of universities in Italy
Women heads of universities and colleges
20th-century Italian engineers
20th-century women engineers
21st-century Italian engineers
21st-century women engineers